Černíky is a municipality and village in Kolín District in the Central Bohemian Region of the Czech Republic. It has about 200 inhabitants.

History
The first written mention of Černíky is from 1293.

From 1 January 2021, Černíky is no longer a part of Nymburk District and belongs to Kolín District.

Gallery

References

Villages in Kolín District